Dubravice is a village in the municipality of Bratunac, Bosnia and Herzegovina.

References

Villages in Republika Srpska
Populated places in Bratunac